Jeffrey Jerome Brockhaus (born April 15, 1959) is an American former professional football player who played in the National Football League for the San Francisco 49ers for three games in 1987.

References

Living people
1959 births
San Francisco 49ers players
Missouri Tigers football players
American football placekickers
National Football League replacement players